Joe Arlooktoo (born June 26, 1939) is a northern Canadian artist, adept at soapstone and ivory carving, and a municipal and territorial-level politician who was a member of the Northwest Territories Legislature from 1979 until 1991. He is a current councillor of Kimmirut, Nunavut.

Arlooktoo ran for a seat in the Northwest Territories Legislature in the 1979 Northwest Territories general election winning the Baffin South electoral district. He was re-elected to a second term in the 1983 Northwest Territories general election. He served a third term and final term being returned in the 1987 Northwest Territories general election. Arlooktoo was defeated by Kenoayoak Pudlat in the 1991 Northwest Territories general election.

After his defeat from the Northwest Territories Legislature, Arlooktoo was elected as mayor of Kimmirut, Nunavut. in 2000. He was re-elected to another term as mayor in 2004.

Arlooktoo's son, Goo Arlooktoo, also served in the Northwest Territories Legislature from 1995 until 1999.

References

External links
Scrimshaw carving, McCord Museum of Canadian History
Katilvik.com Joe Arlooktoo

1939 births
Members of the Legislative Assembly of the Northwest Territories
Living people
Inuit politicians
Mayors of places in Nunavut
People from Kimmirut
Inuit from the Northwest Territories
Inuit from Nunavut
Inuit artists
Artists from the Northwest Territories